Susanne A. Schneider (born in 1978) is a German neurologist at the Ludwig Maximilians-Universität in Munich, Germany who is known for her work in movement disorders.

Biography 
Susanne Schneider studied medicine in Freiburg im Breisgau, Germany. and completed a Ph.D. in Neuroscience at University College London. She finished her habilitation at University of Lübeck. As of 2022 she is a professor at Ludwig Maximilian University of Munich.

Her field of interest is Parkinson's disease, dystonia and rare movement disorders, especially those with a genetic component. During the COVID-19 pandemic she worked on the links between COVID-19 and movement disorders.

Selected publications 

Reviewed by the International Parkinson and Movement Disorder Society and winner of the Neurology first prize at the BMA Medical Book Awards

Awards and prizes 
In 2006, she received the William Koller Memorial Fund Award for "significant contribution to clinical research in the field of Movement Disorders” from the International Parkinson and Movement Disorders Society. In 2009, she received the David Marsden Award from the European Dystonia Society for her 2009 paper published in The Lancet Neurology. In 2011 Schneider received the Jon Stolk Award in Movement Disorders for Young Investigators from the American Academy of Neurology. In 2010, Marsden's Book of Movement Disorders, co-authored by Schneider, won the Oppenheim-Preis from the German Dystonia Society. The 2013 edition won the Neurology first prize from the British Medical Book Awards.

References 

Alumni of University College London
Academic staff of the Ludwig Maximilian University of Munich
Living people
Women neurologists
1978 births